KXMP-LD, VHF digital and virtual channel 8, is a low-powered MeTV-affiliated television station licensed to Harrison, Arkansas, United States. The station is owned by Springfield TV.

External links

XMP-LD
Television channels and stations established in 2002
2002 establishments in Arkansas
Low-power television stations in the United States
Harrison, Arkansas